Vichuquén is a commune in the Curicó Province of Chile's Maule Region.

History 
The Spanish arrived along the Lico rivers in 1585, where settlements of the Mapuche and Inca already existed. In 1865, Vichuquén founded its capital of the village of the same name.. In 1987, the old part of the town was declared a "Typical Zone Vichuquén" for its colonial style architecture.

Geography 
Vichuquén is located northwest of the Curicó Province. It also has the Vichuquén lakes Lago Vichuquén (es) in its boundaries, as well as the Laguna Torca National Reserve.

Demographics
Of these, 1,368 (27.8%) lived in urban areas and 3,548 (72.2%) in rural areas. The population fell by 0.3% (15 persons) between the 1992 and 2002 censuses.

Administration
As a commune, Vichuquén is a third-level administrative division of Chile administered by a municipal council, headed by an alcalde who is directly elected every four years. The 2008-2012 alcalde is Román Pavez López (PPD).

Within the electoral divisions of Chile, Vichuquén is represented in the Chamber of Deputies by Roberto León (PDC) and Celso Morales (UDI) as part of the 36th electoral district, together with Curicó, Teno, Romeral, Molina, Sagrada Familia, Hualañé, Licantén and Rauco. The commune is represented in the Senate by Juan Antonio Coloma Correa (UDI) and Andrés Zaldívar Larraín (PDC) as part of the 10th senatorial constituency (Maule-North).

References

External links
  Municipality of Vichuquén

Communes of Chile
Populated places in Curicó Province